This list of Romanian international footballers contains football players who have played for the Romania national football team, listed according to their number of caps. 887 players have played for the team since it started officially registering its players in 1913. Some sources show that 896 players played for the national team, that is because in 2007 after a recommendation from FIFA, the Romanian Football Federation decided to erase 33 matches that were played between 1959 and 1984 from the national team's records, those matches belong now to Romania's Olympic team records.

20 caps or more
Key
 GK – Goalkeeper
 DF – Defender
 MF – Midfielder
 FW – Forward
 Bold – currently available for selection.
 * – member of the 1994 FIFA World Cup Golden Team.

Only players with 20 or more official caps are included. The caps for Romania's Olympic team during 1959–1984 are not included. The table is up to date as of 26 December 2022.

Players per debut year
The caps for Romania's Olympic team during 1959–1984 are not included. The table is up to date as of 26 December 2022.

References

 
Association football player non-biographical articles